The Ministry of Tourism is a department of the government of Syria.

Responsibilities 
The ministry is responsible for the promotion and development of domestic and foreign tourism, by what it does directly or through companies and tourism institutions, such as tourism marketing and tourism services, and the establishment and investment of tourist areas and facilities, directly or indirectly, and generally undertakes all matters related to tourism and vacationing in the country. The ministry also manages tourism facilities and their investment, and tourism training through hotel vocational high schools and technical institutes for tourism and hotel sciences.

See also 
 Government ministries of Syria
 Tourism in Syria

References 

Ministries established in 1972
Government ministries of Syria
Tourism ministers
Tourism in Syria